Zolivar (also Romanized as Z̄olīvār; also known as Zoleyvā and Zolīvā) is a village in Khaveh-ye Shomali Rural District, in the Central District of Delfan County, Lorestan Province, Iran. At the 2006 census, its population was 518, in 114 families.

References 

Towns and villages in Delfan County